Dan Evans was the defending champion, but did not play to defend his title.

Alexander Bublik won the title after defeating Liam Broady 6–2, 6–3 in the final.

Seeds

Draw

Finals

Top half

Bottom half

References
Main Draw
Qualifying Draw

Nordic Naturals Challenger - Singles
2017 Singles